Lucius Day Copeland was a pioneering 19th-century engineer and inventor from Phoenix, Arizona who demonstrated one of the first motorcycles, the Copeland steam bicycle, a steam-powered Star high-wheeler at the first Arizona Territorial Fair in 1884.

Three-wheeler

Copeland also invented the first successfully mass-produced three-wheeled car. About 200 of his "Phaeton steamers" were produced before he retired in 1891.
About 200 were produced before Copeland decided that he wasn't making enough money and retired in 1891.

References

External links

 Picture of Lucius Copeland and his steam bicycle in 1884
 Copeland's 'Steam Tricycle Patent 1887
 Advert for the Phaeton Moto-Cycle 1890

People from Phoenix, Arizona
19th-century American inventors
Steam motorcycle designers
Year of death missing
Year of birth missing